Cyperus nigrofuscus is a species of sedge that is native to parts of China.

See also 
 List of Cyperus species

References 

nigrofuscus
Plants described in 1961
Flora of China